Valerian and the City of a Thousand Planets  is a 2017 space opera film written and directed by Luc Besson, and produced by his wife, Virginie Besson-Silla. It is based on the French science fiction comics series Valérian and Laureline, written by Pierre Christin, illustrated by Jean-Claude Mézières, and published by Dargaud. It stars Dane DeHaan as Valerian and Cara Delevingne as Laureline, with Clive Owen, Rihanna, Ethan Hawke, Herbie Hancock, Kris Wu and Rutger Hauer in supporting roles. Besson independently financed and personally funded the film. With a production budget of around $223 million, it is both the most expensive European and independent film ever made.

Valerian and the City of a Thousand Planets was released on 20 July 2017 in Germany by Walt Disney Studios Motion Pictures Germany, in the United States on 21 July by STXfilms, in France on 26 July by EuropaCorp Distribution, in China on 25 August by China Film Group, in Belgium on 26 August by Belga Films, and 27 November in United Arab Emirates by Gulf Film. It received mixed reviews from critics, who criticized the plot and some of the casting, but praised the visuals. It grossed $225 million worldwide but, due to its high production and advertising costs, was considered a box-office bomb following its release in the United States.

Plot

In the 28th century, due to cooperation between the Earth and extraterrestrial peoples, the former International Space Station has been expanded until its mass threatens to cause gravitational disruption to Earth itself. Relocated to deep space, it becomes Alpha, a space-traveling city inhabited by millions of species from thousands of planets. A police division is created by the United Human Federation to preserve peace throughout the galaxy. Among its staff are the arrogant Major Valerian and his partner, no-nonsense Sergeant Laureline.

En route to a mission, Valerian dreams of a planet, Mül, where a low-tech humanoid race lives peacefully. They fish for pearls containing enormous amounts of energy and use animals to replicate them. Wreckage begins plummeting from the sky, followed by a huge spacecraft that causes an explosion annihilating every being on the planet. Some of the inhabitants enter a discarded vessel, accidentally trapping themselves inside, but the planet's princess Lihö-Minaa is stranded outside. Just before her death, she conveys a telepathic message.

Shaken, Valerian awakes. Analysis reveals he might have received a signal from across time and space. He learns that his mission is to retrieve a "Mül converter". It is the last of its kind, and currently in the hands of black market dealer Igon Siruss. Valerian asks Laureline to marry him, but she brushes him off.

In a marketplace on planet Kirian in an alternate dimension, Valerian disrupts a meeting between Igon and two hooded figures who resemble the humanoids from his vision. They seek the converter, the small animal in his vision. Valerian and Laureline recover the converter and steal one of the energy pearls. Aboard their ship, Valerian learns that Mül was destroyed 30 years earlier, and all information about it is classified.

They return to Alpha where commander Arün Filitt informs them the center of the station has been irradiated by an unknown force, rendering it highly toxic. Troops sent into the area have not returned, and the radiation is increasing. Laureline and Valerian are assigned to protect the commander during an interstation summit to discuss the crisis; against the commander's wishes, Laureline maintains possession of the converter.

During the summit, unidentified humanoids suddenly attack, incapacitating everyone and kidnapping Filitt. Valerian chases the kidnappers to the irradiated area but crashes his spaceplane during the pursuit. Laureline enlists alien information brokers known as Dogan Daguis to track Valerian and finds him unconscious at the edge of the irradiated zone. She rouses him, but is kidnapped by a primitive tribe, the Boulan Bathors of the planet Goara, and presented at their emperor's dinner as the choice course. Valerian infiltrates the tribe's territory with the help of the shape-shifting Bubble. They rescue Laureline and escape, but Bubble is fatally wounded.

Valerian and Laureline venture further into the irradiated area, discover it is not dangerous, and that it contains the remains of some antique spacecraft. They reach a large, shielded hall where they find the humanoids, known as the Pearls, with an unconscious Filitt. The Pearls' leader, Emperor Haban Limaï, explains that his people lived peacefully on Mül until a battle occurred between the Federation and another faction. Filitt, the human commander, ordered the use of fusion missiles that disabled the enemy mothership and sent it crashing into the planet, annihilating Mül. Upon her passing, Princess Lihö-Minaa transferred her soul into Valerian's body.

When the surviving Pearls were trapped in a downed space vehicle from the battle, they managed to repair it and learned the humans' technology and history. They eventually came to Alpha, where they assimilated more knowledge and built a ship of their own. They needed the converter and pearl in order to launch their ship and find a planet to recreate their homeworld. Filitt admits his role in the genocide, but argues it was necessary to end the war—as was the coverup, to prevent humans from losing their credibility and influence in Alpha. Valerian and Laureline disagree, arguing that the commander is trying to avoid the consequences of his actions. When Filitt becomes belligerent, Valerian knocks him out.

Valerian hands over the pearl he took from Igon, and Laureline persuades him to return the converter. While the Pearls prepare their spacecraft for takeoff, Filitt's K-Tron robot soldiers attack the Pearls and the government soldiers sent to assist Valerian, but are ultimately defeated. The spacecraft departs and Filitt is arrested. Valerian and Laureline are left adrift aboard an Apollo Command/Service Module, and Laureline answers Valerian's marriage proposal with a "maybe" as they wait for rescue.

Cast

 Dane DeHaan as Valerian, a United Human Federation soldier and Laureline's partner/love interest
 Cara Delevingne as Laureline, a United Human Federation soldier and Valerian's partner/love interest
 Clive Owen as Arün Filitt, Valerian and Laureline's commander
 Rihanna as the human form of Bubble, a shapeshifting Glamopod entertainer.
 Ethan Hawke as Jolly the Pimp, Bubble's "protector".
 Herbie Hancock as Defence Minister
 Kris Wu as Sergeant Neza
 Rutger Hauer as The President of the World State Federation
 John Goodman as Igon Siruss , a Kodar'Khan pirate captain and the galaxy's most-wanted criminal
 Elizabeth Debicki as Emperor Haban Limaï 
 Sasha Luss as Princess Lihö-Minaa
 Sam Spruell as General Okto Bar
 Ola Rapace as Major Gibson
 Alain Chabat as Bob the Pirate
 Thom Findlay as The Pirates 
 Mathieu Kassovitz as Camelot on Big Market
 Jonas Bloquet as K-Tron Warrior/Control Room Soldier
 Sand Van Roy as Jessica Rabbit Creature
 Louis Leterrier as Captain Welcoming Mercurys
 Olivier Megaton as Captain Welcoming KCO2
 Gavin Drea as Sergeant Cooper
 Eric Lampaert as Guide Thaziit, a human guiding tourists in the Big Market
 Claire Tran as Control room Sergeant

Production

Development
Although Luc Besson loved the Valerian comics while growing up, he did not seriously consider adapting them into a movie until he was working on The Fifth Element. During development, Besson had hired Valerian illustrator Jean-Claude Mézières to work on the film, who asked Besson, "Why are you doing this shitty film? Why you don’t do Valerian?" At the time, Besson felt that making the film was "impossible" given the vast alien-to-human ratio. The release of Avatar served as both a blessing and a curse for Besson; he has said, "technically, I could see that we can do everything now. The film proved that imagination is the only limit." However, he also felt that "James Cameron pushed all the levels so high", which made him believe that his script was not good enough, so he rewrote it. Ultimately, the storyboarding for the film took seven months.

The project was first publicly reported in 2012. The two principal stars, Dane DeHaan and Cara Delevingne, were announced in May 2015. On 19 August 2015, Clive Owen signed on to play Commander Arün Filitt in the film. The budget, €197 million, is by far the largest ever assembled for a French film. Previously, Asterix at the Olympic Games was the most expensive, at €78 million, just ahead of Besson's The Fifth Element (€75 million). By the end of August 2015, Besson said in an RTL radio interview that shooting the film in France was too expensive. Because it was filmed in a foreign language (English), Besson was unable to benefit from tax credits, despite preferring to produce the film in France and create jobs for 1,200 crew members. The criteria to obtain these tax credits were then adapted accordingly. In May 2015, it was announced Fundamental Films would invest  in the film.

Filming

Principal photography on the film began on 5 January 2016 in seven sound stages dedicated to the film at the Cité du Cinéma, in Saint-Denis, north of Paris. In total, there are 2,734 visual effect shots. The humanoid race the Pearl were completely synthetic creations by Weta Digital, which generated the characters from performances by actors with motion-capture equipment for their face and bodies.

Marketing
The trailer featured the Beatles song "Because", which is the first time a Beatles master recording had been featured outside a Beatles film advertisement.

Visual effects
Industrial Light and Magic, Weta Digital and Rodeo FX provided the effects for the film with Scott Stokdyk as the main supervisor.

Release
The first teaser for Valerian was released on 10 November 2016. The teaser depicts Marmakas, an Entertainer (Bubble, identified as "Glamopod" in the film), Bagoulins, and Shingouz (known as "Doghan Daguis" in the film), who all appear in the album Ambassador of the Shadows; much of the film's setting and story is also derived from that instalment. A special exclusive preview of Valerian was shown prior to the Fathom Events 4K restoration showing of The Fifth Element on 14 May and 17 May.

Valerian was released in Israel on 20 July 2017, on 21 July in the United States, on 26 July in France. and on 2 August in the UK  Lionsgate handles the film's release in the United Kingdom and Ireland, and STX Entertainment distributes the film in the United States. The film was  released on 25 August 2017 in China.

Home media
Valerian and the City of a Thousand Planets was released online on 7 November 2017, and on Ultra HD Blu-ray, Blu-ray and DVD on 21 November 2017.

Theme park attraction 
In 2018, Europa-Park added VR to its roller coaster, Eurosat - CanCan Coaster themed around Valerian as part of the roller coaster's refurbishment.

Soundtrack 
The official soundtrack for Valerian was released on 21 July 2017 on vinyl, CD, and download. The total duration of this soundtrack album is exactly the same number of minutes as the duration of the film itself — 137 minutes.

Track listing

Reception

Box office
Valerian and the City of a Thousand Planets grossed $40.5 million in the United States and Canada and $184.7 million internationally (including $36.8 million in France), for a worldwide total of $225.2 million. With a production budget around $180 million, the film would have needed to gross $400 million worldwide in order to break even and justify a sequel.

In North America, Valerian opened alongside Dunkirk and Girls Trip, and was initially projected to gross $20–25 million from 3,553 theaters, although some insiders believed it would open in the teens. It made $6.5 million on its first day, including $1.7 million from Thursday night previews at 2,600 theaters, lowering weekend projections to $16.5 million. The film ended up debuting to $17 million, finishing 5th at the box office, leading Deadline Hollywood to already label the film a domestic box office bomb, and causing an 8.31% fall of the EuropaCorp stock on the following Monday. In its second weekend, the film dropped 62% to $6.4 million, finishing 8th at the box office. In its third and fourth weekends the film made $2.4 million and $901,323, finishing 12th and 17th and dropping another 62% both times.

Outside North America, the film opened in 16 markets alongside the US and made $6.5 million over its opening weekend, including $2.5 million in Germany. In France, the film made $3.72 million (€3.19 million) on its first day, the second-best opening day of 2017 there behind Despicable Me 3. In China, the film made $9.9 million on its first day from 78,000 screens, becoming the first film to displace Wolf Warriors 2 at the country's box office. It went on to open to $29 million, topping the box office.

Critical response
Valerian and the City of a Thousand Planets received mixed reviews from critics, who praised its visuals while criticizing the plot and some of the casting. On review aggregation website Rotten Tomatoes, the film has an approval rating of 48% based on 300 reviews, with an average rating of 5.50/10. The site's critical consensus reads, "Valerian and the City of a Thousand Planets uses sheer kinetic energy and visual thrills to overcome narrative obstacles and offer a viewing experience whose surreal pleasures often outweigh its flaws." On Metacritic, which assigns a weighted average rating to reviews, the film has a score of 51 out of 100, based on reviews from 45 critics, indicating "mixed or average reviews". On French entertainment information website AlloCiné, the film has an average grade of 3.0/5, based on 31 critics. Audiences polled by CinemaScore gave the film an average grade of "B−" on an A+ to F scale.

David Ehrlich of IndieWire gave the film a grade of B−, praising how "unapologetically idiosyncratic" the film is, while also saying "the vividness of this place only underscores the lifelessness of the people leading us through it .... There are 394 million stories on the City of a Thousand Planets, and Valerian’s might be the only one we’ve seen before. Still, any excuse to visit this place is one worth taking." Peter Sciretta of /Film touted the first half of Valerian as "unpredictable and bonkers insane", while calling the second half more formulaic and "far less exciting", though he still encouraged seeing the film in 3D "on the biggest screen possible". Ignatiy Vishnevetsky of The A.V. Club wrote that it was "rare […] to see a film this extravagant that also feels, for better or worse, like the work of a single personality. The longer action scenes may not always rank with Besson’s early ’90s highlights [...] or the mania of the more recent Lucy, but there isn’t a moment in this ludicrous, lushly self-indulgent movie that doesn’t feel like its creator is having the time of his life."

Todd McCarthy of The Hollywood Reporter gave a negative review, saying: "The Razzies don't need to wait until the end of the year to anoint a winner for 2017 ... Hollywood studio chiefs can breathe easy that, this time, at least, they'll escape blame for making a giant summer franchise picture that nobody wants to see, since this one's a French import." A. O. Scott of The New York Times was also less than happy with the film, writing the effort "feels as if it were made up on the spot, by someone so delighted by the gaudy genre packaging at his disposal that he lost track of what was supposed to be inside." National Public Radio film critic, Mark Jenkins, additionally wrote in a negative review that the film's "perspective often seems more 19th- than 26th-century, notably in a sequence where Laureline is captured by members of a hostile species and forced to don a white dress to be presented to their emperor. The blobby computer-generated creatures resemble natives from the most racist of Tarzan movies."

Accolades 
At the 44th Saturn Awards, Valerian and the City of a Thousand Planets was nominated for the Saturn Awards for Best Science Fiction Film, Best Production Design (Hugues Tissandier), and Best Costume Design (Olivier Bériot); all respectively lost to Blade Runner 2049 (2017), Black Panther (2018, Hannah Beachler), and Beauty and the Beast (2017, Jacqueline Durran).

Potential sequel

Though the film is a box office bomb, director Luc Besson claimed in September 2017 that a sequel was still possible due to positive fan reaction.

See also
 List of films featuring space stations

References

External links

 

2010s adventure films
2010s romance films
2017 science fiction action films
2017 3D films
2017 films
English-language French films
EuropaCorp films
Films about shapeshifting
Films about extraterrestrial life
Fiction about intergalactic travel
Films based on French comics
Films directed by Luc Besson
Films produced by Luc Besson
Films scored by Alexandre Desplat
Films set in the 22nd century
Films set in the 26th century
Films set in the 28th century
Films set on fictional planets
Films set on spacecraft
Films shot in Paris
Films with screenplays by Luc Besson
French 3D films
French action adventure films
French romance films
French science fiction action films
French science fiction adventure films
Fundamental Films films
Genocide in fiction
Lionsgate films
Live-action films based on comics
Films using motion capture
Science fantasy films
Space adventure films
Space opera films
STX Entertainment films
Valérian and Laureline
2010s English-language films
2010s French films